Allen Morris may refer to:

 W. Allen Morris, real estate and mortgage broker
 Allen Morris (historian) (1909–2002), historian of the Florida legislature and Clerk of the House
 Allen Morris (tennis) (1932–2017), tennis player and coach

See also
Allan Morris (disambiguation)
Alan Morris (disambiguation)